Ibrahim Aziz may refer to:
 Ibrahim Aziz (political analyst) (born 1938), Turkish Cypriot political analyst
 Ibrahim Aziz (athlete) (born 1959), Emirati sprinter